The Hills District (alternatively the Hills Shire, or The Hills) is a region of Sydney, within the northern part of the Greater Western Sydney region of Sydney, in the state of New South Wales, Australia. Stretching from the M2 Hills Motorway in the south to the Hawkesbury River in the north and Old Windsor Road in the west to Pennant Hills Road in the east, its constituent suburbs are located in the local government areas of The Hills Shire, and parts of Hornsby Shire and City of Parramatta.

Geography

The Hills District Historical Society restricts its definition to the Hills Shire local government area. More generously, the term Hills District is applied to the area generally west of Pennant Hills Road, north of Windsor Road, and extending as far as the western boundary of the Hills Shire.

The region is so named for its characteristically comparatively hilly topography as the Cumberland Plain lifts up, joining the Hornsby Plateau; and the Hawkesbury Plain lifting up and joining the same Hornsby Plateau. Several of its suburbs also have 'Hills' in their names, such as Baulkham Hills, Beaumont Hills, Castle Hill, Rouse Hill, Box Hill, Pennant Hills and Winston Hills.

History

Aboriginal settlement 
Since circa 40,000 BC, Dharug People inhabited the Hills and surrounding areas, especially near water bodies. Rock dwellings found near the Darling Mills Creek are almost 12,000 years old. The Dharug would trade with adjacent clans like the Boorooberongal clan in the northwest. In 1789, a smallpox epidemic killed many of their numbers.

European settlement

Initial settlement 
Governor Arthur Phillip surveyed the district in April 1791. His party was in search of a new area for settlement and farming to support a struggling colony in Sydney. In 1794, Hawkesbury Road, later Windsor Road, was built from the Toongabbie Government Farm to the Hawkesbury. In the same year, William Joyce, a pardoned convict, received the first land grant in the area, east of Hawkesbury Road, in what is now Baulkham Hills. He opened an inn on the same road. William Joyce Reserve is a reminder of his property.

Other early settlement 

In 1799, Joseph Foveaux was granted 300 acres of land in what is now the Bella Vista area of Baulkham Hills. He sold this land to John Macarthur, and his wife, Elizabeth, the two of whom pioneered in wool manufacturing, and are attributed to starting Australia's wool industry. Part of this land was later acquired by Matthew Pearce. His farm was called 'Bella Vista Farm'. Foveaux Terrace, Elizabeth Macarthur Drive, and Macarthur Ridge Way, streets in Bella Vista; and Elizabeth Macarthur Creek starting in Kellyville are named after these early settlers. Matthew Pearce Public School, the largest in the state, is named after Matthew Pearce.

Government Farm in Castle Hill 

Castle Hill Government Farm was established in 1801, and Castle Hill Heritage Park is built upon the land. It is third government farm in the country, built only twelve years after the historic grant of Experiment Farm to James Ruse. It was also a major site in the Battle of Vinegar Hill. Toongabbie Road, now Junction Road in Winston Hills, was built in the same year as the farm from Toongabbie to the junction in Baulkham Hills. Castle Hill Road was built from the junction to the farm in Castle Hill, and survives today as part of Old Northern Road and Old Castle Hill Road. The farm was turned into Australia's first lunatic asylum in 1811, until it was closed in 1826, when it was relocated to Liverpool.

Battle of Vinegar Hill 
The Battle of Vinegar Hill, or Castle Hill Convict Rebellion (sometimes referred to as the Second Battle of Vinegar Hill, so as not to be confused with a rebellion of the same name in Ireland) is the historic first convict rebellion in Australia, and the only one suppressed under martial law. Vinegar Hill is located in Rouse Hill, and the rebellion occurred on 4 March 1804. Over 200 convicts escaped from a prison farm with the intent to "capture ships to sail to Ireland". Martial law was instated, and the rebels were hunted down until a truce was declared.

Windsor and Old Windsor Roads 
Windsor and Old Windsor Roads are historic roads in Australia, as they are the second and third roads laid in the colony. They connect Parramatta with Windsor, but are majorly used as arterial roads for residents, especially in the Hills District. There are residential streets in Wentworthville and Westmead over the original alignment of Windsor Road. The original road started at Prospect Road, which is now the Great Western Highway. It went through the Government Farm at Toongabbie. It was widened in 1797 to 20 feet (approximately 6 metres). In 1802, Howe's Bridge was constructed at the crossing of South Creek, Windsor. In 1805, James Meehan surveyed a new alignment of the road, from Parramatta to Kellyville. This was the basis of the new Windsor Road. Governrnor Lachlan Macquarie, as part of his Parramatta Town Plan, commissioned a new toll road, which would follow Church Street across the Parramatta River, then follow the line traced by Meehan to Kellyville. This is approximately the same route that today's Windsor Road follows. This route was preferred, as it avoided many of the hills near Old Windsor Road, and the new Parramatta Government Domain, upon which Parramatta Park is built. New Windsor Road was completed in 1812, featuring 70 bridges, and was 32 feet wide (approximately 10 metres). In 1833, Windsor Road was declared a main road, maintained by public expenses. Old Windsor Road was also proclaimed a parish road. In 1835, Windsor Toll House was built, near South Creek. Bitumen for motor vehicles was laid in 1925. The upgrading for motor vehicles continued throughout the 1930s. The roads are now amongst the most well-serviced roads in the state by buses. The North-West Transit-way (NW T-way) runs along the entirety of Old Windsor Road, and along Windsor Road to Rouse Hill Town Centre.

Population 
According to the 2016 Census, The Hills Shire is home to 157,243 permanent residents. Of these 49.3% were male and 50.7% were female.

Environment & Climate 
As the name indicates, the Hills District is an area of high elevation above sea level (compared with the rest of the Sydney basin) and thus creates orographic rainfall brought in by onshore winds from the Pacific Ocean. This leaves the Hills District with slightly higher rainfall than the rest of Sydney and creates a rain shadow for some places in the Blacktown district, including Marayong and Doonside. This climate characteristic was well suited to orchard production of stone fruit and citrus which proved luxuriant on the deep rich soils.

Most of the suburbs in the Hills District borderline the oceanic climate (Cfb) zone under the Köppen climate classification, as their warmest month mean may barely reach 22 °C (71.6 °F) in some years. Though they are still safely in the humid subtropical climate (Cfa) zone.

Religion 
The area was previously known to have the highest rate of religious service attendance in Australia and was referred to as "Sydney’s Bible Belt". The Hills Shire repeatedly showed higher than average religious affiliation in the Australian Census, and still retains a large Christian population that represents 64.8% of religious people in the area. Despite a high Christian population, the area no longer represents the most religious region of Sydney. In the 2016 Census the Hills Shire was reported to be the tenth most religious local government area in metropolitan Sydney with 21.2% people reporting no religion. In the 2016 Census, the most religious area of metropolitan Sydney was instead Liverpool in South Western Sydney, with only 11.3% of people reporting to have no religion. 

The strong evangelical Christian tinge of the Hills District has made the region strongly conservative, a trend that runs right through local, state and Federal politics. The federal Division of Mitchell, which covers most of the area, is one of the safest seats in metropolitan Australia for the conservative Liberal Party of Australia, and all of the Hills District seats in the New South Wales Legislative Assembly are held by the NSW Liberals.

Public transport 
An extensive number of bus routes operate in the district, operated by Busways and Hillsbus. The region is served by the North-West T-way, connecting the Hills District with Blacktown, Parramatta and Rouse Hill. The now closed Carlingford railway line, operated by Sydney Trains, was the only railway line. Infrequent services operated on the line from Carlingford to Clyde, where an interchange was required to continue to the city. However, the railway line is now being converted into light rail as part of the Parramatta Light Rail project. Another railway line, the Metro North West Line, opened in May 2019, has a frequency of every 4 minutes in the peak hour to Chatswood railway station, where passengers can change to other trains towards the city.

Suburbs 

 Annangrove
 Arcadia
 Baulkham Hills
 Bella Vista
 Beaumont Hills
 Berrilee
 Box Hill
 Carlingford
 Castle Hill
 Cattai
 Cherrybrook
 Dural
 Fiddletown

 Gables
 Galston
 Glenhaven
 Glenorie
 Kellyville
 Kenthurst
 Leets Vale
 Lower Portland
 Maraylya
 Maroota
 Middle Dural

 Nelson
 North Kellyville
 Norwest
 North Rocks
 Oatlands
 Oakville
 Pennant Hills
 Rouse Hill
 Sackville North
 South Maroota
 West Pennant Hills
 Winston Hills
 Wisemans Ferry

Media 
The Hills district is served by a number of local printed newspapers: including:
The Hills to Hawkesbury Community News, The Hills Independent, The Galston Glenorie & Hills Rural News and the Dooral Roundup.

News Local newspapers have ceased printing and can only be accessed online.  The only title left is the Hills Shire Times.

The local community radio station for the district is Alive 90.5 which is based in Baulkham Hills and also broadcasts to Parramatta and Cumberland.

Notes

External links 
 
 Out of the Mouths of Locals - article discussing the geography of the area and the snob value associated with the designation.

Regions of Sydney
The Hills Shire